İqrığ (also, İqriq, Igrik, and Igrykh) is a village and municipality in the Quba Rayon of Azerbaijan.  It has a population of 1,502.

References 

Populated places in Quba District (Azerbaijan)